Sadok Khalgui (born 6 November 1978) is a Tunisian former judoka.

Achievements

References

1978 births
Living people
Tunisian male judoka
Judoka at the 2000 Summer Olympics
Olympic judoka of Tunisia
Mediterranean Games bronze medalists for Tunisia
Mediterranean Games medalists in judo
Competitors at the 2001 Mediterranean Games
African Games medalists in judo
African Games bronze medalists for Tunisia
Competitors at the 1999 All-Africa Games
20th-century Tunisian people
21st-century Tunisian people